The XIII 2018 Oceania Badminton Championships was the continental badminton championships in Oceania sanctioned by the Badminton Oceania, and Badminton World Federation. This championship was organized by Badminton New Zealand, and was the 13th edition of the Oceania Badminton Championships. It was held in Hamilton, New Zealand from 6 to 11 February 2018. The team event started on 6 February, and was the qualification stage for the 2018 Thomas & Uber Cup finals in Thailand, while the individual event will start on February 8.

Venue  
The tournament was held at the Eastlink Badminton Stadium, Hamilton East, Hamilton, New Zealand.

Medalists

Individual event

Team event

Individual event 
The individual event of the 2018 Oceania Badminton Championships were held from 8 to 11 February, at the Eastlink Badminton Stadium, in Hamilton, Waikato, New Zealand. Australia had secured four titles in the women's singles and three doubles event, with Sawan Serasinghe and Setyana Mapasa winning two doubles titles each, and the men's singles title goes to New Zealand.

The three doubles event present all the Australian pair. Serasinghe who was teamed-up with Matthew Chau beat their compatriot Robin Middleton and Ross Smith in the final with the score 21–17, 23–21. Mapasa claimed the women's doubles title after beat Renuga Veeran and Leanne Choo with the score 21–14, 22–20. In the mixed doubles event Mapasa and Serasinghe again became the champion defeat Chau and Choo 21–19, 21–18. The women's singles final also present the Australian players, and Wendy Chen claimed the title after beat Louisa Ma 21–7, 21–14. Abhinav Manota of New Zealand broke the Australian stranglehold on the Oceania championships by winning the men's singles gold medal. Manota beat Remi Rossi of Tahiti in the straight games 21–12, 21–14 in the final.

Men's singles

Seeds 

  Anthony Joe 
  Pit Seng Low 
  Ashwant Gobinathan 
  Jacob Schueler 
  Dylan Soedjasa 
  Daniel Fan 
  Niccolo Tagle 
  Nathan Tang

Finals

Women's singles

Seeds 

  Wendy Chen Hsuan-yu 
  Jennifer Tam 
  Joy Lai 
  Louisa Ma

Finals

Men's doubles

Seeds 

  Matthew Chau / Sawan Serasinghe
  Simon Leung / Mitchell Wheller
  Jonathan Curtin / Dhanny Oud
  Oscar Guo / Dacmen Vong

Finals

Women's doubles

Seeds 

  Setyana Mapasa / Gronya Somerville
  Jasmin Chung Man Ng / Erena Calder-Hawkins
  Leanne Choo / Renuga Veeran
  Grace Cai / Sarah Cai

Finals

Mixed doubles

Seeds 

  Sawan Serasinghe / Setyana Mapasa
  Dhanny Oud / Jasmin Chung Man Ng
  Oliver Leydon-Davis / Susannah Leydon-Davis
  Anthony Joe / Joy Lai

Finals

Team event 
The 2018 Oceania Team Championships officially crowns the best male and female national teams in Oceania and at the same time works as the qualification event towards the 2018 Thomas & Uber Cup finals. 4 teams both in the men's and women's team have entered the tournament. Australia men's and women's team were clinched the Oceania Team titles, and qualified for the 2018 Thomas & Uber Cup finals, after topping the standings both in the men's and women's team. New Zealand men's and women's team were placing second both in the men's and women's team, while Tahiti men's team and Fiji women's team were in the third place.

Seeds 
The seeding, which is based on BWF world rankings, for both the men's and women's competition is the same:

Men's team 

Australia vs. Tahiti

New Zealand vs. Fiji

New Zealand vs. Tahiti

Australia vs. Fiji

Australia vs. New Zealand

Fiji vs. Tahiti

Women's team 

Australia vs. Tahiti

New Zealand vs. Fiji

New Zealand vs. Tahiti

Australia vs. Fiji

Australia vs. New Zealand

Fiji vs. Tahiti

References

External links 
 Oceania Championships 2018
 Individual Results
 Team Results

Oceania Badminton Championships
Oceania Badminton Championships
International sports competitions hosted by New Zealand
Badminton tournaments in New Zealand
Oceania Badminton Championships